MS Thomson Celebration was a cruise ship owned by TUI UK, and last operated by their United Kingdom-based Marella Cruises. She was built in 1984 by Chantiers de l'Atlantique in Saint-Nazaire, France for Holland America Line (HAL) as MS Noordam. On 29 April 2020, Marella announced that the ship would be retired from the fleet and sold for scrap. The ship beached for scrap in Aliaga, Turkey in 2022.

History

Marella Celebration was built by Chantiers de l'Atlantique in 1984 for Holland America Line as Noordam at a cost of $160 million and became the third HAL vessel to bear the name. She was originally furnished with a $1 million art collection, some of which, including a 17th-century Oriental screen, can still be found on board.

After Noordam's last sailing with HAL, the ship was taken out of service and chartered to Thomson Cruises and later rechristened as Thomson Celebration.

On 9 October 2017, Thomson Cruises announced to be renamed Marella Cruises. TUI Group renamed Thomson Celebration to Marella Celebration at the end of October 2017.

On 14 September 2022 the ship left Eleusis towards Aliaga, towed by the tug Vernicos Sifnos.

References

External links
 Photos of the Thomson Celebration

Cruise ships
1983 ships